The 2020 Italian football summer transfer window ran from 1 September to 5 October 2020, due to the effects of the COVID-19 pandemic on the football calendar. This list includes transfers featuring at least one club from either Serie A or Serie B that were completed after the end of the winter 2019–20 transfer window on 31 January and before the end of the 2020 summer window on 5 October.

Transfers
Legend
Those clubs in Italic indicate that the player already left the team on loan on this or the previous season or a new signing that immediately left the club.

Footnotes

References

2020–21 in Italian football
Italy
2020